Mala Ilova Gora is a village in the Municipality of Grosuplje in central Slovenia. The area is part of the historical region of Lower Carniola. The municipality is now included in the Central Slovenia Statistical Region. 

The local church is dedicated to the Holy Cross and belongs to the Parish of Dobrepolje–Videm. It was built in the 1990s.

References

External links

Mala Ilova Gora on Geopedia

Populated places in the Municipality of Grosuplje